Aneuxanthis is a genus of moths belonging to the subfamily Tortricinae of the family Tortricidae.

Species
Aneuxanthis locupletana (Hubner, [1822])

See also
List of Tortricidae genera

References

 , 2005: World catalogue of insects volume 5 Tortricidae.
 , 1933, Amat. Papillons 6: 243.

External links
tortricidae.com

Archipini
Monotypic moth genera
Tortricidae genera